Schmidt's frog may refer to:

 Schmidt's forest frog, a frog found in Brazil, Colombia, French Guiana, and Peru
 Schmidt's mountain brook frog, a frog found in Guatemala and Mexico
 Schmidt's robber frog, a frog endemic to Hispaniola
 Schmidt's snouted frog, a toad endemic to the Democratic Republic of the Congo
 Schmidt's Uruguay tree frog, a frog found in Argentina, Brazil, and Uruguay